Saïd Naceri (born 2 July 1961), known as Samy Naceri, is a French actor known for his work in the four Taxi films and The Code (La Mentale).

Early life and career
Naceri was born to an Algerian Berber Kabyle father and a French mother in the 4th arrondissement of Paris and spent his childhood in the Parisian suburb of Fontenay-sous-Bois. His brother is Bibi Naceri, who co-wrote and co-starred in international hit film District 13. He shared the award for Best Actor for his role in the film Days of Glory at the 2006 Cannes Film Festival.

Personal life
Stemming from a substance abuse charge in 2003, Naceri was sentenced to eight months' imprisonment with deferment, had his driving licence suspended for three years, and was penalized with a €5,000 fine for a road rage incident in which he smashed a car and assaulted one of its occupants.

In November 2005, after waiting for a late guest, Naceri attacked a 22-year-old man with an ashtray at a Paris restaurant. The actor was convicted for assault and spent two months in jail. He was released in February 2006. Then, in December 2006 he was imprisoned for racially abusing police officers. In January 2007 he was accused of attempted murder after stabbing a security guard in Aix-en-Provence. He was sentenced to nine months in prison (six months suspended) for violence and was also sentenced to one month in prison for assaulting two guards at a medical center where he was being treated for overdosing on drugs.

Filmography
 1980: Inspector Blunder (Extra)
 1989: La Révolution française directed by Robert Enrico and Richard T. Heffron (uncredited)
 1994: Léon directed by Luc Besson
 1994: Frères directed by Olivier Dahan
 1995: Coup de vice directed by Zak Fishman
 1995: Raï directed by Thomas Gilou
 1996: Malik le maudit directed by Youcef Hamidi
 1996: La Légende de Dede directed by Antonio Olivares
 1997: Bouge! directed by Jérôme Cornuau
 1997: Autre chose à foutre qu'aimer directed by Carole Giacobbi
 1998: Taxi directed by Gérard Pirès
 1998: Cantique de la racaille directed by Vincent Ravalec
 1999: Un pur moment de rock'n'roll directed by Manuel Boursinhac
 1999: Une pour toutes directed by Claude Lelouch
 2000: Taxi 2 directed by Gérard Krawczyk
 2000: Là-bas, mon pays directed by Alexandre Arcady
 2001: Le Petit Poucet directed by Olivier Dahan
 2001: Nid de guêpes (The Nest) directed by Florent Emilio Siri
 2001: La Merveilleuse Odyssée de l'idiot toboggan directed by Vincent Ravalec
 2001: La Repentie directed by Laetitia Masson
 2001: Féroce directed by Gilles de Maistre
 2002: La Mentale directed by Manuel Boursinhac
 2002: Concerto pour un violon directed by Gilles de Maistre
 2002: Disparu directed by Gilles de Maistre
 2002: Tapis volant directed by Youcef Hamidi
 2003: Taxi 3 directed by Gérard Krawczyk
 2003: Finding Nemo directed by Andrew Stanton (voice of Crush the sea turtle in the French dubbed version)
 2004: Bab el web directed by Merzak Allouache
 2006: Indigènes directed by Rachid Bouchareb
 2007: Taxi 4 directed by Gérard Krawczyk
 2008: Des poupées et des anges directed by Nora Hamidi
 2012: Ce que le jour doit à la nuit, directed by Alexandre Arcady
 2013: Tip Top
 2013: Günahsız Günahım (MV)
 2021: Redemption Day, directed by Hicham Hajji

Awards and nominations

Winner

2006: Cannes Film Festival - Best Actor

1995: Locarno International Film Festival - Best Actor

1995: Festival du Film de Paris - Special Mention

Nominated

1999: Cesar Award for Most Promising Actor

References

External links

 
  Samy Naceri in Allocine website

1961 births
Living people
Male actors from Paris
French male film actors
French people of Kabyle descent
20th-century French male actors
21st-century French male actors
French prisoners and detainees
Prisoners and detainees of France
Cannes Film Festival Award for Best Actor winners